The Diocese of Lodwar may refer to;

Anglican Diocese of Lodwar, in Kenya
Roman Catholic Diocese of Lodwar, in Kenya